Alexander Egger (born in 1971) is an Italian graphic designer, conceptionist, artist, writer and musician. He is working in different media on a range of cultural and commercial projects.  Currently he is currently living and working in Vienna.

Publications

Satellites Mistaken for Stars, Monograph, Gingko Press (California, USA)
People who make noise are dangerous, Zine, Independent Publication (Vienna, Austria)
Places to go, people to see, things to do, Zine, Independent Publication (Vienna, Austria)
Many people would never fall in love if they didn't hear so much about it, Zine, Independent Publication (Vienna, Austria)
In the Long Term We are All Dead, Zine, Independent Publication (Vienna, Austria)
Sex Is Nostalgia for Sex When Once It Was Exciting, Zine, Independent Publication (Vienna, Austria)
But the sun likes me, Zine, (Vienna, Austria)
Why can you smile while you talk bullshit, Zine, (Vienna, Austria)
Buildings, not homes, Zine, (Vienna, Austria)
1984 was an extremely boring year, Zine, (Vienna, Austria)

Music

Waiting For J.: A Bluffers Guide to Pop,  Several live plays in the Basement Room, Vienna
Several fieldrecordings: 2000-2007
The day I have been nowhere/everywhere, Recording project on cassette tapes (ongoing)

External links
http://alexanderegger.com/
http://www.satellitesmistakenforstars.com
https://web.archive.org/web/20071220024116/http://www.gingkopress.com/_cata/_grap/smfstar.htm
http://www.youworkforthem.com/list.php?onsale=&new=&cat=0&action=search&sText=Alexander+Egger&SearchIn=0&sort=relative&view=18
http://www.digitalthread.com/designcompanies/graphic_design/satellites_mist.php
https://web.archive.org/web/20071213155548/http://www.spunkunited.com/v2/alexander.html

1971 births
Living people
Italian artists